Tranmere Rovers F.C. regained Third Division status at the first attempt in 1975–76. John King replaced Ron Yeats as manager and Ronnie Moore was switched to attack with great success, scoring as Tranmere started with a 1–1 draw at Swansea City. They rose to the top of the table after winning nine times in eleven games, including beating Torquay United 7–1 and Workington 6–0. John James was signed from Chester City, then Clive Griffiths arrived from Manchester United as Rovers remained in the promotion race. Moore scored four times against Brentford, Stockport County and Newport County in quick succession, scoring a total of 34 goals as Tranmere finished fourth.

Final league table

References 

 

 

Tranmere Rovers F.C. seasons
Tranmere Rovers